The 1976 ABN World Tennis Tournament was a men's tennis tournament played on indoor carpet courts at Rotterdam Ahoy in the Netherlands. It was part of the 1976 World Championship Tennis circuit. It was the fourth edition of the tournament was held from 23 February through 29 February 1976. Arthur Ashe won the singles title.

Finals

Singles
 Arthur Ashe defeated  Bob Lutz 6–3, 6–3

Doubles
 Rod Laver /  Frew McMillan defeated  Arthur Ashe /  Tom Okker 6–1, 6–7(4–7), 7–5(7–5)

Draws

Singles

References

External links
 Official website 
 Official website 
 ATP tournament profile
 ITF tournament edition details

 
1976 in Dutch tennis
1976 World Championship Tennis circuit